Terrie Waddell is an Australian former actress best known for her role as Lisa Mullins in the television series Prisoner.

Career
Waddell is a graduate of the Victorian College of the Arts. Upon her graduation, she appeared in theatre, before she was offered the role of Lisa Mullins in Prisoner during its final season in 1986. She had little acting experience when she was approached to play the role at short notice, replacing Nicki Paull, who had taken ill during production. The producers chose Waddell due to her likeness to Nicki Paull. She remained in the series until its final episode.

She subsequently moved away from acting to become a lecturer in media studies at La Trobe University.

Filmography

Film

Television

Video games

Bibliography
 Mis/takes: Archetype, Myth and Identity in Screen Fiction, 2006.
 Wild/lives: Trickster, Place and Liminality on Screen, 2014.
 Eavesdropping: The Psychotherapist in Film and Television, 2015.
 The Lost Child Complex in Australian Film: Jung, Story and Playing Beneath the Past, 2019.

References

External links
 

1960s births
Living people
Year of birth missing (living people)
Academic staff of La Trobe University
Australian film actresses
Australian soap opera actresses
20th-century Australian actresses